The Charles Seney House, also known as the Van Heel Residence, is a historic building located in Mason City, Iowa, United States.  This house is attributed to local architect Einar Broaten and built by Sivert Rivedal, a native of Norway.  It utilizes the Mason City variant of the Prairie School style to stucco over corbelled masonry to form the wall panels for visual effect.  The two-story house, completed in 1913, is capped with a hip roof.  It was listed on the National Register of Historic Places in 1980.

References

Houses completed in 1913
Prairie School architecture in Iowa
Houses in Mason City, Iowa
National Register of Historic Places in Mason City, Iowa
Houses on the National Register of Historic Places in Iowa